The Washwash River is a river in the Central Coast region of British Columbia, Canada, flowing generally west out of the Pacific Ranges into the Tzeo River just above the Tzeo's mouth into the head of Owikeno Lake.

General information
 Topography Feature Category: River
 Geographical Feature: River
 Canadian Province/Territory: British Columbia
 Elevation: 909 meters
 Location: Coast Land District

See also
List of British Columbia rivers

References

Rivers of the Central Coast of British Columbia
Rivers of the Pacific Ranges